The following is a list of rulers of the Kingdom of Naples, from its first separation from the Kingdom of Sicily to its merger with the same into the Kingdom of the Two Sicilies.

Kingdom of Naples (1282–1501)

House of Anjou

In 1382, the Kingdom of Naples was inherited by Charles III, King of Hungary, great grandson of King Charles II of Naples. After this, the House of Anjou of Naples was renamed House of Anjou-Durazzo, when Charles III married his first cousin Margaret of Durazzo, member of a prominent Neapolitan noble family.

House of Valois-Anjou (disputed)

Joanna of Naples had refused to name her enemy Charles of Durazzo as heir to the Neapolitan throne despite him ending up succeeding her anyway. If Charles' line was ignored, the subsequent heirs would be the descendants of Margaret, Countess of Anjou, a daughter of Charles II of Naples; the line pointed to the kings of France of the House of Valois. Joanna chose this line, though she named as heir, her second cousin once removed, Louis of Valois-Anjou, the second son of King John II of France, in order to avoid a personal union with France.

As Charles III had already seized the Neapolitan throne, initially the House of Valois-Anjou only had an empty claim. One of their members, Louis II, succeeded in ruling Naples for a time.

Time as claimant instead of actual rule will be shown in italic.

House of Anjou (restored)

House of Valois-Anjou (restored)
Joanna II recognised Louis III of Anjou as heir in 1423, however he died in 1434 before succeeding to the throne. His brother René of Anjou succeeded to the claim and became king upon Joanna's death in 1435.

House of Trastámara

Before Louis of Anjou, Queen Joanna II's adopted heir had been Alfonso, King of Aragon. He refused to be disinherited and conquered Naples from René of Anjou in 1442.

Union with France (1501–1504)

Upon his death in 1480, René of Anjou transferred his claim to his nephew, Charles IV of Anjou. Charles died in 1481 and willed his claim to Louis XI of France. His son Charles VIII attempted to take Naples by force, but failed and died childless in 1498.

Charles VIII was succeeded by his 2nd  cousin once removed Louis XII. Louis had no claim to the Neapolitan throne, but as successor to Charles VIII in France he nevertheless wanted to succeed him in Naples as well.

Naples was conquered in 1501 and became part of a personal union with the Kingdom of France. The local government was ruled by a French viceroy.

House of Valois-Orléans

Union with Spain (1504–1647)

Naples was in a personal union with the Kingdom of Aragon, under Ferdinand II.  Over time, Aragon and the Kingdom of Castile merged to form the Monarchy of Spain, known colloquially as the "Kingdom of Spain", though the constituent crowns retained their own institutions, and were ruled officially as separate states in personal union rather than as a unified state.  The local government was ruled by a Spanish viceroy. The royal houses were:
 House of Trastámara (1504–1516)
 House of Habsburg (1516–1647)

House of Trastámara

Joanna III was kept confined under alleged insanity during her whole reign.

House of Habsburg

Neapolitan Republic (1647–1648)

House of Guise

Officially a Republic, Naples was governed for a short time by the Duke of Guise, under the title of "Doge of Naples".

Union with Spain (1648–1713)

Naples was in a personal union with the Kingdom of Spain, under Philip IV. The local government was ruled by a Spanish viceroy. The royal houses were:
 House of Habsburg (1648–1700, claimed succession 1700-13, conquered 1707-13)
 House of Bourbon (1700-1713); renounced claim in the Treaty of Utrecht

House of Habsburg

House of Bourbon

Kingdom of Naples (1713–1799)

House of Habsburg

House of Bourbon

Parthenopean Republic (1799)

Dictators

Kingdom of Naples (1799–1816)

House of Bourbon

House of Bonaparte

House of Murat

House of Bourbon

See also
 List of monarchs of the Kingdom of the Two Sicilies
 List of consorts of Naples
 List of viceroys of Naples
 List of monarchs of Sicily
 Kings of Naples family tree

References

Kings of Sicily
Naples
Monarchs